Peter John is a German sprint canoer who competed in the late 1990s. He won a bronze medal in the C-2 1000 m event at the 1999 ICF Canoe Sprint World Championships in Milan.

References

Year of birth missing (living people)
Living people
German male canoeists
ICF Canoe Sprint World Championships medalists in Canadian